Kazivera or Ghaziveran is a small village in Cyprus, west of Morphou. De facto, it is under the control of Northern Cyprus.

References

Communities in Nicosia District
Populated places in Lefke District